Brandon Starcevich (born 24 July 1999) is a professional Australian rules footballer playing for the Brisbane Lions in the Australian Football League (AFL). Starcevich is the nephew of Brisbane AFL Women's coach Craig Starcevich.

Early football
Starcevich is from Western Australia, and was a Fremantle Dockers fan in his youth. He originally played for Mt Lawley-Inglewood Junior Football Club. Starcevich joined West Australian Football League club East Perth, playing 20 colts games across 2016–17 and averaging 13 disposals. He also played cricket, athletics and football for Trinity College. Starcevich played for Western Australia in the 2017 AFL Under 18 Championships and attended the AFL Draft Combine. However, he was limited by a quad injury. Starcevich tested at the WA State Draft Combine and won the  sprint with a time of 2.87 seconds. He was drafted by Brisbane with pick 18 in the 2017 national draft, their third selection, and was described as a 'contested bull'.

AFL career
In 2018, Starcevich made his debut against  in round 20 after strong form in the North East Australian Football League. He recorded five tackles and nine disposals. Soon after, Starcevich signed a two-year contract extension, tying him to Brisbane until 2021. In the 13th round of the 2020 AFL season, Starcevich earned a 2020 AFL Rising Star nomination for his performance against St Kilda, where he collected 10 disposals and took 4 marks.

Statistics
Updated to the end of the 2022 season.

|-
| 2018 ||  || 37
| 4 || 1 || 2 || 20 || 16 || 36 || 5 || 8 || 0.3 || 0.5 || 5.0 || 4.0 || 9.0 || 1.3 || 2.0
|-
| 2019 ||  || 37
| 1 || 0 || 0 || 7 || 0 || 7 || 2 || 1 || 0.0 || 0.0 || 7.0 || 0.0 || 7.0 || 2.0 || 1.0
|-
| 2020 ||  || 37
| 18 || 1 || 2 || 125 || 43 || 168 || 57 || 29 || 0.1 || 0.1 || 6.9 || 2.4 || 9.3 || 3.2 || 1.6
|-
| 2021 ||  || 37
| 24 || 0 || 0 || 216 || 82 || 298 || 90 || 41 || 0.0 || 0.0 || 9.0 || 3.4 || 12.4 || 3.8 || 1.7
|-
| 2022 ||  || 37
| 24 || 3 || 0 || 268 || 90 || 358 || 107 || 49 || 0.1 || 0.0 || 11.2 || 3.8 || 14.9 || 4.5 || 2.0
|- class=sortbottom
! colspan=3 | Career
! 71 !! 5 !! 4 !! 636 !! 231 !! 867 !! 261 !! 128 !! 0.1 !! 0.1 !! 9.0 !! 3.3 !! 12.2 !! 3.7 !! 1.8
|}

Notes

Honours and achievements
Individual
 22under22 team: 2021
 AFL Rising Star nominee: 2020 (round 13)

References

External links 

 
 

Living people
1999 births
Australian rules footballers from Western Australia
Brisbane Lions players
People educated at Trinity College, Perth